The 2020 UCI Cycling Esports World Championships was the first edition of the UCI Cycling Esports World Championships, the annual world championships for esport road bicycle racing. It was held on 9 December 2020 on the platform Zwift.

The men's race was won by Jason Osborne, an Olympic rower for Germany, while the women's race was won by Ashleigh Moolman Pasio, a South African professional road cyclist. Both winners received $9,600 in prize money.

Schedule

Results

Men's race

Women's race

References

External links